Joan "Nan" Ribera Masó (born 22 April 1975) is a retired Spanish football midfielder.

References

1975 births
Living people
Spanish footballers
Footballers from Catalonia
Girona FC players
UE Figueres footballers
RCD Espanyol footballers
Deportivo Alavés players
UD Salamanca players
Association football midfielders
La Liga players
Segunda División players